John Herman Lucas (12 June 1922 – 18 May 2008) was a Barbados former West Indian and Canadian cricketer. He was a right-handed batsman and a right-arm off-break bowler. He began his career playing for Barbados, playing twelve first-class matches. He later emigrated to Canada and played three first-class matches for the Canadian national team. He finished his career with an impressive batting average of 53.70 with a highest score of 216 not out.

References
Cricket Archive profile
Cricinfo profile

1922 births
2008 deaths
Canadian cricketers
Barbadian cricketers
Barbados cricketers
Barbadian emigrants to Canada
People from Saint Michael, Barbados